The London Film Critics' Circle Award for Director of the Year in an annual award given by the London Film Critics' Circle.

List of winners

See also
BAFTA Award for Best Direction
Critics' Choice Movie Award for Best Director

Notes
≈ Academy Award for Best Director winner
° Academy Award for Best Director nominee

Multiple winners
The following directors have won multiple awards:
2 wins – Andrzej Wajda (1981, 1983)
2 wins – David Fincher (2008, 2010)
2 wins – Ang Lee (2005, 2012)
2 wins – Alfonso Cuarón (2013, 2018)

References

Awards for best director
Director
Awards established in 1980